Holly Nixon (born 7 December 1993) is a British rower. She won the gold medal in the coxless four at the 2016 World Rowing Championships with Donna Etiebet, Fiona Gammond and Holly Norton.. She won a bronze medal at the 2017 World Rowing Championships in Sarasota, Florida, as part of the quadruple sculls with Bethany Bryan, Mathilda Hodgkins-Byrne and Jessica Leyden.

In 2021, she won a European bronze medal in the double sculls in Varese, Italy.

References

External links

Holly Nixon at British Rowing

Living people
1993 births
British female rowers
World Rowing Championships medalists for Great Britain